Kim André Madsen (born 12 March 1989) is a Norwegian footballer who currently plays for Asker. He is also the assistant coach. He came for FC Lyn Oslo before the 2009 season, and has also been on loan at Nybergsund IL.

He spent ten seasons with Strømsgodset, winning the league in 2013 and the cup in 2010. Due to frequent injuries, he played fewer games in the final seasons, before leaving after the 2018 season.

Career statistics

Honours

Club

Strømsgodset
 Tippeligaen: 2013

References

External links
Player info at godset.no

1989 births
Living people
Footballers from Oslo
Norwegian footballers
Norway international footballers
Lyn Fotball players
Nybergsund IL players
Strømsgodset Toppfotball players
Eliteserien players
Norwegian First Division players
Association football defenders